Mira Topić (born ) is a Croatian female volleyball player, playing as an outside-spiker. She is part of the Croatia women's national volleyball team. She competed at the 2015 Women's European Volleyball Championship. On club level she plays for Impel Breslavia.

References

1983 births
Living people
Croatian women's volleyball players
Place of birth missing (living people)
Outside hitters